The 1960–61 NBA season was the Detroit Pistons' 13th season in the NBA and fourth season in the city of Detroit.  The team played home games at Olympia Stadium.

The Pistons finished 34-45 (.430), 3rd in the Western Division.  The team advanced to the playoffs, losing to the Los Angeles Lakers 3-2 as Laker Elgin Baylor dominated the series with a 39.4 ppg average in the series.  Detroit was led on the season by forward Bailey Howell (23.6 ppg, 14.4 rpg, NBA All-Star), center Walter Dukes (11.7 ppg, 14.1 rpg, NBA All-Star) and guard Gene Shue (22.6 ppg, 6.8 apg, NBA All-Star).

Regular season

Season standings

x – clinched playoff spot

Record vs. opponents

Game log

Playoffs

|- align="center" bgcolor="#ffcccc"
| 1
| March 14
| @ Los Angeles
| L 102–120
| Gene Shue (20)
| Walter Dukes (11)
| Los Angeles Memorial Sports Arena
| 0–1
|- align="center" bgcolor="#ffcccc"
| 2
| March 15
| @ Los Angeles
| L 118–127
| McMillon, Shue (24)
| Walter Dukes (12)
| Los Angeles Memorial Sports Arena4,253
| 0–2
|- align="center" bgcolor="#ccffcc"
| 3
| March 17
| Los Angeles
| W 124–113
| Bob Ferry (30)
| —
| Detroit Olympia3,422
| 1–2
|- align="center" bgcolor="#ccffcc"
| 4
| March 18
| Los Angeles
| W 123–114
| Gene Shue (29)
| —
| Detroit Olympia
| 2–2
|- align="center" bgcolor="#ffcccc"
| 5
| March 19
| @ Los Angeles
| L 120–137
| Bob Ferry (25)
| Bob Ferry (16)
| Los Angeles Memorial Sports Arena3,705
| 2–3
|-

Awards and records
Gene Shue, All-NBA Second Team

References

Detroit Pistons seasons
Detroit
Detroit Pistons
Detroit Pistons